Aan de Zuwe is a hamlet in the Dutch province of Utrecht. It is located in the municipality of De Ronde Venen, 3 km south of Wilnis.

It is first mentioned in 1936 as Aan-de-Zuwe, and references the Willenser Zuwe, a canal on which the hamlet is situated. The canal is named after the "sidewards (dike)" of Wilnis . Aan de Zuwe is not a statistical entity, and the postal authorities have placed it under Wilnis. There are no place name signs. Aan de Zuwe consists of a dozen houses and 40 to 50 holiday homes.

References

Populated places in Utrecht (province)
De Ronde Venen